Yuriy Victorovich Meshcheryakov (27 August 1946 in Moscow – 6 October 2001 in Moscow) was a Soviet, Russian and Ukrainian animator, one of a number of outstanding Soviet animators, who worked at the end of the "golden era" of Soviet animation.

Biography
Yuriy was born in Moscow on 27 August 1946.

In 1965 he graduated from the College of Architecture in Moscow.

He attended a course for animators at the studio "Soyuzmultfilm" in 1971 – 1972 year.

Yuriy Meshcheryakov was invited to work on The Films of The Great Soviet directors like Ivan Ivanov-Vano, Roman Kachanov, Fedor Khitruk and other masters.

He made a unique contribution to fifty cartoon films.

When the Soviet animation lost with the collapse of the USSR, Yuri grieved unemployment and economic crisis.

He died on 6 October 2001.

Selected filmography

Art Director
1989 – The Lake on The Bottom of The Sea (Озеро на дне моря)

Animator
1975 – How the Cossacks Bought the Salt (Как казаки соль покупали)
 1982 – About an Old Man, an Old Woman and Thiere Hen Ryaba (О деде, бабе и курочке Рябе)
 1984 – The Tale of Tsar Saltan (Сказака о царе Салтане)
 1984 – Lev i byk (Лев и бык)
 1985–  Dereza (Дереза)
 1987 – The Porridge of Bogatyr (Богатызская каша)
 1988 – The Incident with a Hippopotamus (Случай с бегемотом)
 1992 – Glasha and Kikimora (Глаша и Кикимора)
 1995 – People: A Musical Celebration

Artist
1991 – Submarine Berets

References

External links
 

1946 births
2001 deaths
Russian animators
Soviet animators